Yang-Tse Cheng is an American materials scientist currently the University of Kentucky Frank J. Derbyshire Professor of Materials Science at University of Kentucky and an Elected Fellow of the National Academy of Inventors Materials Research Society and American Physical Society.

Education
He earned his B.S in physics-mathematics, his M.S. and Ph.D in applied physics at California Institute of Technology. He worked as an engineer for General Motors before teaching at Purdue University in 2007 until starting at University of Kentucky that year.

Research
His interests are nanostructured materials, energy conversion and storage,  and sustainable manufacturing and engineering. His highest cited paper is "Scaling, dimensional analysis, and indentation measurements" at 1036 times, according to Google Scholar.

Publications
Yang-Tse Cheng, Daniel E Rodak. Is the lotus leaf superhydrophobic? 86:14. 144101. Applied Physics Letters. 2005.
Yang-Tse Cheng, Che-Min Cheng. Relationships between hardness, elastic modulus, and the work of indentation. 73:5. 614-616. Applied physics letters 1998.
Yang T Cheng, DE Rodak, CA Wong, CA Hayden. Effects of micro-and nano-structures on the self-cleaning behaviour of lotus leaves. 17:5. Nanotechnology. 2005.
Yang-Tse Cheng, Che-Min Cheng. Scaling approach to conical indentation in elastic-plastic solids with work hardening. 84:3. 1284-1291. Journal of Applied Physics. 1998.

References

University of Kentucky faculty
American materials scientists
California Institute of Technology alumni
Fellows of the American Physical Society